Calvin Anthony Lewis (born 23 March 1965) is a former West Indian cricketer. Lewis was a right-handed batsman who bowled right-arm off break.

In February 2006, Lewis played for the United States Virgin Islands in the 2006 Stanford 20/20, whose matches held official Twenty20 status. He made two appearances in the tournament, in a preliminary round victory against St Maarten and in a first-round defeat against St Vincent and the Grenadines. He took 3 wickets during the tournament at an average of 5.66 and with best figures of 2/7. He later played for the United States Virgin Islands in their second appearance in the Stanford 20/20 in 2008, making two appearances in a preliminary round victory against St Kitts and in a first-round defeat against Antigua and Barbuda. He again took 3 wickets in the tournament, at an average of 11.66 and with best figures of 3/16. His total of 6 wickets for the United States Virgin Islands makes him the teams joint–leading wicket taker alongside Dane Weston, though Lewis took his wickets at a better average.

References

External links

1965 births
Living people
United States Virgin Islands cricketers
Place of birth missing (living people)